Cornett Wood (September 12, 1905 – May 16, 1980) was an American animator and layout artist. 

Along with other Disney animators Harry Reed and John A. Waltz, Wood was a graduate of the Herron School of Art in Indianapolis.

He served as an animator on Snow White and the Seven Dwarfs and Fantasia for Walt Disney, and eventually went on to work on layouts for Robert McKimson at Warner Bros. Cartoons.

He worked on Looney Tunes cartoons.

He died in 1980.

References

External links 

 

1905 births
1980 deaths
American animators
Walt Disney Animation Studios people
Warner Bros. Cartoons people
Herron School of Art and Design alumni